The Yapacana National Park Also Cerro Yapacana National Park Is a protected area with the status of national park in the South American country of Venezuela which was formed on December 12, 1978 by executive decree of President Carlos Andres Perez. It is located southwest of the confluence of the Ventuari River on the Orinoco River, in the jurisdiction of the Atabapo municipality of Amazonas state.

Among the ecological and protection objectives of the Yapacana National Park is preserving and conserving areas that represent a valuable scenic and scientific resource, with a pioneering vegetation, a testimony to the evolution of the vegetation with Paleotropic and Neotropic floristic connections.

The Yapacana National Park is located in the southwestern sector of the Guayanese shield in the central western region of the Amazon state between the Orinoco rivers in the south and the Ventuari river in the north and the Yagua river in the west. The park includes the Yapacana hill, typical Pantepuy plateau of the Roraima formation.

See also
List of national parks of Venezuela
Morrocoy National Park

References

National parks of Venezuela
Guayana Highlands
Geography of Amazonas (Venezuelan state)
Protected areas established in 1978
1978 establishments in Venezuela
Tourist attractions in Amazonas (Venezuelan state)